Georg Philipp Rugendas (27 November 1666 – 1742) was a  battle and military genre painter and engraver born in the Free Imperial City of Augsburg in what is now Bavaria, Germany.

Biography
He was a pupil of Isaak Fisches, an historical painter, took Bourguignon, Lembke, and Tempesta for his models, but formed his style more especially through the study of the various phases of the military profession, from real life. He continued his studies for two years in Vienna, and in 1692 under Antonio Molinari in Venice, thence went to Rome.

During the siege and pillage of Augsburg in 1703, he exposed himself to great danger by drawing, in the midst of the engagements, the scenes around him. The six etchings resulting from this are perhaps the most meritorious part of his work. His oil paintings may best be studied in the Brunswick Gallery, which contains nine battle pieces by him.

Notes

References
 

Attribution
  This work in turn cites a monograph by Count Stillfried (Berlin, 1879).

External links

1666 births
1742 deaths
17th-century German painters
German male painters
18th-century German painters
18th-century German male artists
Engravers from Augsburg